Vermillion Creek is a  tributary of the Green River. It flows south from Sweetwater County, Wyoming to a confluence with the Green River just north of the Gates of Lodore in Moffat County, Colorado.

See also
 List of rivers of Colorado
 List of tributaries of the Colorado River

References

Rivers of Colorado
Rivers of Moffat County, Colorado
Tributaries of the Colorado River in Colorado